Rob Norbury is a British actor most popular for portraying Donnie Briscoe in CBBC drama Grange Hill, Riley Costello in the Channel 4 soap opera Hollyoaks and Leon in Emmerdale.

Norbury grew up in Oldham. Norbury is involved in the restaurant business, opening a restaurant called Muse in Uppermill and taking over a pub called The Farrars Arms in Grasscroft.

Awards and nominations

References

External links

Living people
Year of birth missing (living people)
Place of birth missing (living people)
Nationality missing
British male soap opera actors